John Lawrence Rudolph (March 21, 1938 – June 23, 2019) was an American football player who played linebacker for six seasons in the American Football League (AFL), first for the Boston Patriots and then for the Miami Dolphins.  Rudolph was an original Boston Patriot, and an original Miami Dolphin.

See also
 List of American Football League players

References

1938 births
2019 deaths
American football linebackers
Boston Patriots players
Georgia Tech Yellow Jackets football players
Miami Dolphins players
Players of American football from Atlanta
Players of American football from St. Louis